Coaldale is a census-designated place (CDP) and post office located in and governed by Fremont County, Colorado, United States. The CDP is a part of the Cañon City, CO Micropolitan Statistical Area. The Coaldale post office has the ZIP Code 81222. At the United States Census 2010, the population of the Coaldale CDP was 255, while the population of the 81222 ZIP Code Tabulation Area was 263 including adjacent areas.

Geography
Coaldale is located in southwestern Fremont County. It is bordered to the northwest by the community of Howard. The northeastern edge of the CDP follows the Arkansas River, and U.S. Route 50 follows the river through the CDP.

The CDP extends southwest out of the Arkansas River valley up into San Isabel National Forest and the Sangre de Cristo Range. The southeastern edge of the CDP follows the Hayden Creek valley up to Hayden Pass; the southwestern edge follows the Saguache County line along the crest of the Sangre de Cristos; and the northwestern edge follows Stout Creek and Kerr Gulch Road back down to the Arkansas River valley.

Demographics

See also

 List of census-designated places in Colorado

References

External links

 Coaldale @ Colorado.com
  Coaldale @ UncoverColorado.com
 Coaldale, Colorado Mining Claims And Mines
 Fremont County website

Census-designated places in Fremont County, Colorado
Census-designated places in Colorado
Colorado populated places on the Arkansas River
1891 establishments in Colorado